De Borgia Schoolhouse is a two-story wood-frame school located in De Borgia, Montana, United States which was listed on the National Register of Historic Places on December 27, 1979.  Constructed in 1908, the schoolhouse was the first two-story building built in the West End of Mineral County and is the only building now standing in De Borgia to survive the Great Fire of 1910.  The school closed in 1956, becoming a community center for the town.

References
Notes

School buildings on the National Register of Historic Places in Montana
National Register of Historic Places in Mineral County, Montana
Schools in Mineral County, Montana
School buildings completed in 1908
1908 establishments in Montana
Community centers in Montana